David Collins (born 30 October 1971) is an Irish former footballer who played in the Football League for Oxford United and Wigan Athletic.

Personal life
Collins' family includes a number of other footballers, including his son Nathan Collins. His brother, Eamonn Collins, played with many sides including Southampton and Portsmouth before going on to manage St Patrick's Athletic. His eldest son Josh Collins is also a footballer who plays for League of Ireland Premier Division side Waterford.

References

Republic of Ireland association footballers
English Football League players
1971 births
Living people
Association football defenders
Liverpool F.C. players
Wigan Athletic F.C. players
Oxford United F.C. players
Shelbourne F.C. players
Athlone Town A.F.C. players
League of Ireland players
Republic of Ireland expatriate association footballers
Expatriate footballers in England
Irish expatriate sportspeople in England